Mama, I Want to Sing! may refer to:

 Mama, I Want to Sing! (musical), a 1983 off-Broadway musical
 Mama, I Want to Sing! (film), a 2012 musical film